Hashtown is an unincorporated community in Richland Township, Greene County, Indiana.

Hashtown has been noted for its unusual place name.

Geography

References

Unincorporated communities in Greene County, Indiana
Unincorporated communities in Indiana
Bloomington metropolitan area, Indiana